Orson Welles (1915–1985) was an American director, actor, writer, and producer who is best remembered for his innovative work in radio, theatre and film. He is widely considered one of the greatest and most influential filmmakers of all time.

While in his twenties, Welles directed a number of stage productions before creating the infamous 1938 radio adaptation of H. G. Wells's novel The War of the Worlds. Welles's directorial film debut Citizen Kane (1941), in which he also starred as Charles Foster Kane, garnered him the Academy Award for Best Original Screenplay and nominations for Best Actor and Best Director. The film is consistently ranked as the greatest film ever made. Welles's second film was The Magnificent Ambersons (1942). He then directed and starred in the film-noir The Lady from Shanghai (1947), appearing opposite his estranged wife Rita Hayworth. His 1951 film Othello won the Palme d'Or at the Cannes Film festival. In 1958, Universal-International released the Welles-directed Touch of Evil, in which he also starred alongside Charlton Heston and Janet Leigh. His The Trial (1962) received a nomination for the Golden Lion at the Venice Film Festival. He subsequently directed Chimes at Midnight (1966), in which he also starred as Falstaff. Welles's last completed features were the essay films F for Fake (1973) and Filming Othello (1978). Throughout his career, he also worked on numerous films which he abandoned due to legal issues, lack of funds, or loss of interest and which were never completed or released. Two of these unfinished feature films have been completed and released posthumously: Don Quixote (1992) and The Other Side of the Wind (2018). However, many of Welles's other projects are now considered lost films.

Welles also had a successful career as an actor, appearing in dozens of films. In 1937, he collaborated with Ernest Hemingway on The Spanish Earth. In 1943, he starred opposite Joan Fontaine in Jane Eyre. His first appearance as Harry Lime in the 1949 film-noir The Third Man was heralded as "the most famous entrance in the history of the movies" by Roger Ebert. In 1956, he appeared as Father Mapple in the John Huston-directed Moby Dick. His performance in Compulsion (1959) earned him the Cannes Film Festival Award for Best Actor. Welles starred as Le Chiffre in the James Bond-film Casino Royale (1967). He portrayed Louis XVIII in Waterloo (1970). In 1979, he appeared in The Muppet Movie. His performance in Butterfly (1982) garnered him a nomination for the Golden Globe Award for Best Supporting Actor. Welles also narrated several documentaries, television series, and films, including King of Kings (1961), Bugs Bunny: Superstar (1975), and Mel Brooks's comedy-film History of the World, Part I (1981).

Welles was granted an Academy Honorary Award for his works in 1971. Four years later, he became the third recipient of the American Film Institute's Life Achievement Award. In 1983, two years prior to his death, Welles received the Directors Guild of America Lifetime Achievement Award.

Production

Completed feature films

Completed short films

Completed television programs

Film fragments for stage productions

Uncompleted films and television programs

Performance

Film

Television

Uncompleted films and television programs

See also
 Orson Welles theatre credits
 Orson Welles radio credits
 Orson Welles discography

References

Citations

Works cited

External links
 Orson Welles on IMDb
 Orson Welles at the Rotten Tomatoes

Welles, Orson
Works by Orson Welles
American filmographies
Male actor filmographies